Chamaeclea is a genus of moths of the family Noctuidae.

Species
 Chamaeclea basiochrea Barnes & McDunnough, 1916
 Chamaeclea pernana (Grote, 1881)

References
 Chamaeclea at Markku Savela's Lepidoptera and Some Other Life Forms
 Natural History Museum Lepidoptera genus database

Amphipyrinae